The 2018 Diamond Head Classic was a mid-season eight-team college basketball tournament that was played on December 22, 23, and 25 at the Stan Sheriff Center in Honolulu, Hawaii. It was the tenth annual Diamond Head Classic tournament, and is part of the 2018–19 NCAA Division I men's basketball season.

Bracket
* – Denotes overtime period

Campus Site Games

Championship Round

Source

References

Diamond Head Classic
Diamond Head Classic
Diamond Head Classic